Play (stylized as ᑭᒪᗩY) is the first concert residency hosted by American singer Katy Perry. The first eight concerts were announced in May 2021, which ran at The Theatre of Resorts World Las Vegas from December 29, 2021 to January 15, 2022. Eight more shows were added later that month in response to popular demand, extending the residency to March 2022. Ticket sales became widely available to purchase on May 24 after a pre-sale for those with Citibank cards. Perry announced in January 2022 that she had added 16 more shows for May through August. On June 1, 2022, she announced that a further eight shows were added for October, due to increasing demand.

Perry opened Play to a sold-out crowd at the Resorts World theatre, with the furthest seat being only 150 feet away from the stage. In February 2022, the first set of boxscores were reported by Billboard. She earned $6.98 million from the eight reported dates and drew a total of 31,933 attendees in the timeframe. From these earnings, she reached the top spot on the Artist Power Index (APX) chart by Pollstar.

Background 
The show draws influence from Honey, I Shrunk the Kids, Pee-wee's Playhouse, and Pee-wee's Big Adventure. Perry also stated "It's just gonna be a feast for both the ears and the eyes and it is like the most laughter I've had in a rehearsal setting ever in my life. My co-creators and collaborators and the dancers and the band, everybody's just like, 'This is the kookiest idea.'"

Production 

Several parts of the show have been described by media outlets such as Vogue as "camp", with such examples being Perry descending from the ceiling and being placed on a gigantic bed, interacting with a giant toilet and a giant face mask while performing, and a huge red rocking horse. Christian Allaire of Vogue called her the "Queen of Camp" for her approach to the show, saying: "Perry's playful, tongue-in-cheek approach to dressing really makes the show for us. More than a decade into her impressive career, she's clearly still a reigning queen of camp."

Critical response 
Play received critical acclaim. Mark Gray from Rolling Stone said that "the production was larger than life" for the residency's opening night, further adding: "the show is quintessential Perry, who indulged the emotional, the over-the-top, the whimsical, the psychedelic, and even the cheesy over the course of 95 minutes". Melinda Sheckells of Billboard also gave the first show a positive review, stating that Perry "left another unforgettable mark on the Strip in front of a sold-out, all-ages crowd of 5,000 loudly purring KatyCats", further adding: "'Perry Playland' transports the audience into another dimension of rainbow fluff, heart-shaped confetti and larger-than-life anthropomorphic household objects — it's part fantasy, part hallucination and thoroughly high-camp Perry." Yahoo! contributor Joyann Jeffrey felt Perry "perfectly wrapped up 2021 in a nutshell when she toasted a giant face mask onstage, and sang on top of some giant toilet paper rolls, which sat beside a huge bathtub and toilet" with Play and wrote the outfits used were "equally as amazing".

Setlist 
Perry revealed the set list on December 28, 2021, a day before the first show was scheduled to start.

 "E.T."
 "Chained to the Rhythm"
 "Dark Horse"
 "Not the End of the World"
 "California Gurls"
 "Hot n Cold" / "Last Friday Night (T.G.I.F.)"
 "Waking Up in Vegas"
 "Bon Appétit"
 "Daisies"
 "I Kissed a Girl"
 "Lost" / "Part of Me" / "Wide Awake"
 "Never Really Over"
 "Swish Swish"
 "When I'm Gone" / "Walking on Air"
 "Teenage Dream"
 "Smile"
 "Roar"
 "The Greatest Love of All"
 "Firework"

Shows

References 

2021 concert residencies
2022 concert residencies
2023 concert residencies
Concert residencies in the Las Vegas Valley
Katy Perry
Resorts World Las Vegas